Hakan Topal is an artist living and working in Brooklyn, New York. He was the co-founder with Guven Incirlioglu of xurban collective (2000–12), and is known for his research-based conceptual art practice. He is an Associate Professor of New Media and Art+Design at Purchase College, SUNY.

Education
Hakan Topal attended Middle East Technical University (METU) in Ankara, where he also grew up. Trained as a civil engineer, during his studies Topal became an active member of the university's activist networks and visual arts community, where he realized exhibitions and performances. He received an M.S. degree from the Gender and Women’s Studies graduate program at METU. He continued studies in sociology, receiving an M.A. and Ph.D. from the New School for Social Research with a concentration in urban sociology and sociology of art.

Exhibitions
Topal exhibited his collective and individual artworks and research projects in institutions such as the 8th and 9th Istanbul Biennials; apexart, New York; Thyssen-Bornemisza Art Contemporary (TBA21), Vienna; Kunst-Werke, Berlin; ZKM Center for Art and Media; MoMA PS1; Kunstwerke, Berlin; Platform, Istanbul and Roundtable: The 9th Gwangju Biennale. He recently contributed to "Harbor" show at Istanbul Modern Museum, Istanbul, and "Perpetual Revolution" at International Center of Photography Museum, New York.

Topal represented Turkey at the 49th Venice Biennale. His texts and projects have been featured in many international journals, books, and catalogs. He is co-editor of the book, The Sea-Image: Visual Manifestations of Port Cities and Global Waters which is the outcome of visual research and an international symposium for the Istanbul European Capital of Culture 2010.

Bibliography 
 “Urgency: Artistic Responses to Natural Disasters, The Case of New Orleans” in MaHKUscript. Journal of Fine Art Research. 2016
 “Mırıltıdan, Homurdanmaya: Sanatın Yeni Bağlamı”, introduction to Pascal Gielen’s Turkish translation “Murmuring of the Artistic Multitude: Global Art, Politics and Post-Fordism”. Istanbul: Norgunk Yayinlari. 2016
 “Impossibility of Professional Art or Politics of Amateurism” in Dosya 37. Edited by Gokcecicek Savasir. Journal of Architecture. Issue 37. Ankara Architectural Association. 2016
 “Fighting the Banality of Moderates: An Artist’s Vision for a Peaceful Turkey” in Hyperallergic. March 31, 2016
 “Against Anatolia: Ruins and Friendship” in Serhh Poetry and Criticism Journal. Istanbul. Issue 3. May 2015
 “The Poetics of Remembrance: Facing The Armenian genocide” in Creative Time Reports, April 2015
 “Collateral Damage, Condolence and the Aesthetic of Impossibility Justice” in Aesthetic Justice, edited by Pascal Gielen and Niels Van Tomme. Valiz, Amsterdam. 2014
 Topal, Hakan. “On Bottany Carcinoma” in Mobility and Fantasy in Visual Culture, edited by Lewis Johnson. Routledge, New York. 2014
 Altındere, Hallil and Evren Sureyya, eds. 101 Artworks: 40 Years of Turkish Contemporary Art. Rotterdam: Revolver, 2011
 Topal, Hakan and Incirlioglu, Guven. "The-Sea-Image: Visual Manifestations of Port Cities and Global Waters". New York: Newgray, 2011
 Kafetsi, Anna. Politics of Art. Athens: EMST, 2010
 Amirsadeghi, Hossein. Unleashed: Contemporary Art from Turkey. London: Thames & Hudson, 2010
 Carvalho, Denise. Bodies of Dispersion: Mechanism of Distention. Galeria Arsenal, 2010
 Biesenbach, Klaus. Political/Minimal. Nürnberg: Verlag für Moderne Kunst, 2009
 Mortenbock, Peter. and Helge Moonshammer. Networked Cultures: Parallel Architectures and the Politics of Space. Rotterdam: NAI Publishers, 2008
 ACMA. Biennale Del Paesaggio Mediterraneo'. Milan: ACMA Centro Di Architettura, 2008
 Altindere, Haili., Evren S, eds. User's Manual / Contemporary Art in Turkey: 1986-2006. Istanbul: Revolver Books, 2007
 Elliot, David. Time Present, Time Past: Highlights from 20 Years of the Istanbul Biennial. Istanbul Modern, 2007
 Madra, Beral. Neighbours in Dialogue. Istanbul: Feshane, 2007
 Erdemci, Fulya, ed. Modern and Beyond. Istanbul Bilgi University Press, 2007
 Biesenbach, Klaus. Greater New York. New York: PS1 / MoMA, 2005
 Eche, Charles and Vasif Kortun. 9th International Istanbul Biennial. Istanbul Art and Culture Foundation, 2005
 Conover, Roger. Call Me Istanbul. Karlsruhe: ZKM, 2004
 Mermoz, Gerard. Time Lines: Reading the City of Signs. Istanbul: Aksanat Center, 2004
 Cameron, Dan. Poetic Justice: The 8th International Istanbul Biennial. Istanbul: Istanbul Art and Culture Foundation, 2003
 Akay, Ali. 60 years 60 Artists. Istanbul: Eczacibasi, 2002
 Madra, Beral, eds. The Perfumed Garden. Istanbul: 49th Venice Biennial Turkish Pavilion, 2001
 Ronte, Dieter, eds. Under the Sign of the City: Contemporary Art from Turkey. Bonn: Kunstmuseum Bonn, 2001
 49th International Venice Biennial: Plateau of Humankind''. Venice: Venice Biennial, 2001

References

External links
Official site
xurban_collective Website

Turkish conceptual artists
New media artists
1972 births
American people of Turkish descent
People from Çorum
Artists from New York (state)
Turkish contemporary artists
Living people
Middle East Technical University alumni